Rubin Peak is a prominent rock summit rising to over 1100 m in the central part of Carnegie Range, Churchill Mountains. The peak is 11 nautical miles (20 km) north of Russell Bluff. Named by Advisory Committee on Antarctic Names (US-ACAN) after Vera Rubin, observational astronomer, Department of Terrestrial Magnetism, Carnegie Institution of Washington, 1965–2002; with Carnegie Institution co-worker Kent Ford, Rubin confirmed that most of the universe consists of dark matter, 1978.

References

Mountains of the Ross Dependency
Shackleton Coast